Rhodomyrtus is a group of shrubs and trees in the family Myrtaceae described as a genus in 1841. The genus is native to southern China, the Indian Subcontinent, Southeast Asia, Melanesia, and Australia.

Its greatest levels of diversity are on New Guinea and in northeastern Australia.  DNA sequence data and morphological data indicate that the genus is artificial (polyphyletic). Additional studies are needed before it can be split into two or more smaller monophyletic genera.

Species

References

Myrtaceae genera
Taxa named by Augustin Pyramus de Candolle